Persatuan Sepakbola Indonesia Kota Tidore is an Indonesian football club based in Tidore, North Maluku. They currently compete in the Liga 3 and their home stadium is Gelora Nuku Stadium.

References

External links
 Profile at PSSI

Tidore
Football clubs in North Maluku
Football clubs in Indonesia
Association football clubs established in 1958
1958 establishments in Indonesia